Mondo (Italian, Ido, and Esperanto for world), may refer to:

People
Michael Mondo, Papua New Guinean rugby league footballer
Mondo Guerra, American fashion designer
Armand ”Mondo” Duplantis, Swedish pole vaulter

Computer science
 Mondo Rescue, a GPL data backup and recovery software project
 Mondo, a beta build of Microsoft Office 2010

Culture and entertainment

Fictional characters
 Mondo (comics), a comic book character
 Montgomery “Mondo” Brando, a character from the American animated sitcom Good Vibes
 Mondo (Toshinden character), a character in the Battle Arena Toshinden fighting game series
 King Mondo, the leader of the fictional Machine Empire and the main villain in Power Rangers: Zeo
 Mondo Agake, a character from Mobile Suit Gundam ZZ
 Mondo Gecko, a supporting character in Teenage Mutant Ninja Turtles
 Mondo, a "professional bug-hunter" from the Aliens comic book series
 Mondo Owada, a character from the video game Danganronpa: Trigger Happy Havoc
 Mondo Tatsumi, a character from the Kyuukyuu Sentai GoGo-V
 Misao Mondo, a character from the Doubutsu Sentai Zyuohger
 Mondo Zappa, main character from the video game Killer Is Dead
 The Mondo-Bot, a character in the fourth season of the animated TV series Samurai Jack

Film
 Mondo Cane, a 1962 documentary film
Mondo film, a documentary film style named after the 1962 movie
 Mondovino, a 2004 documentary film
 Mondo (film), a 1995 drama directed by Tony Gatlif

Music
 Mondo Generator, a US band
 Mondo Gecko, is a Boston-based "Neo-Jam Band" who mixes a blend of intricate compositions, catchy songs and a fun stage presence 
 Mondo Records, a record label

Albums
 Mondo, album by Luca Carboni 
 Mondo (album), a 2012 debut album by Electric Guest

Songs
 "Mondo", Cesare Cremonini song
 "Mondo Fever", a song by My Life with the Thrill Kill Kult
 "Mondo Bondage", a song by The Tubes from their Eponymous first album
 "Mondo Bondage", a song by Die Ärzte on the Runter mit den Spendierhosen, Unsichtbarer! album, played on the Jazzfäst tour

Companies
 Mondo (American company), a company known for releasing custom movie posters, vinyl soundtracks, and apparel
 Mondo (Italian company), a manufacturing company known for producing athletic rubber products 
 Mondo TV, an Italian production and distribution animation company
 Mondo Media, a company that provides shows
 Mondo (bank), a UK-based bank

Other uses
 Mondo (beverage), fruit-flavored beverage
 Mondo language
 Mondo (scripture), recorded collection of dialogues between a pupil and a rōshi (a Zen Buddhist teacher)
 Mondo (Tanzanian ward), an administrative ward in the Kondoa district of the Dodoma Region of Tanzania
 Mondo 2000, a publication aimed at cyberpunks and dubbed "the next millennium's first magazine"
 MONDO (Monarch Disease Ontology), ontology developed by the Monarch Initiative.
 Ophiopogon, a genus of plants

See also
 Il Mondo (disambiguation)
 Mondovi (disambiguation)
 Mondo a go go (disambiguation)